Jean Ferniot (10 October 1918 – 21 July 2012) was a French journalist and novelist. He won the Prix Interallié in 1961.

Early life
Ferniot was born on 10 October 1918 in Paris, France. He grew up in the 14th arrondissement of Paris. He became an orphan at the age of eight, when his mother died. He was raised as a Roman Catholic, and he considered becoming a priest as a young man.

Ferniot was educated at the Lycée Louis-le-Grand in Paris. He briefly served in World War II, and he was subsequently awarded the Croix de Guerre.

Career
Ferniot was a journalist. He began his career at the Agence France-Presse. He subsequently worked for Franc-Tireur and France Soir. He then joined L'Express as a political and culinary columnist. He was also a contributor to Radio Luxembourg until 1983.

Ferniot was the author of several books. He won the Prix Interallié for L’Ombre portée in 1961. He was a Commander of the Ordre des Arts et des Lettres.

Personal life and death
Ferniot was married three times. With his second wife, journalist Christiane Collange, he had two sons, Vincent Ferniot and Simon Ferniot. He has five children.

He died on 21 July 2012 in Paris. He was 93 years old.

Works

References

1918 births
2012 deaths
Writers from Paris
Recipients of the Croix de Guerre 1939–1945 (France)
20th-century French journalists
20th-century French novelists
Commandeurs of the Ordre des Arts et des Lettres
Prix Interallié winners
French military personnel of World War II